Molly Mae Penfold (born 15 June 2001) is a New Zealand cricketer who plays for the Auckland Hearts. In April 2021, Penfold was added to New Zealand's Women's Twenty20 International (WT20I) squad for their third WT20I match against Australia. In August 2021, Penfold was added to New Zealand's squad for their tour of England, replacing Rosemary Mair who was ruled out due to an injury. She made her Women's One Day International (WODI) debut on 21 September 2021, for New Zealand against England.

In February 2022, Penfold was added to New Zealand's squad as a reserve player for the 2022 Women's Cricket World Cup.

Early life
Penfold was born in Kingston Upon Thames, England, but moved to Auckland with her family at a young age. Her older sister, Josie, plays for Auckland alongside her.

References

External links

2001 births
Living people
New Zealand women cricketers
New Zealand women One Day International cricketers
New Zealand women Twenty20 International cricketers
Auckland Hearts cricketers
Cricketers from Greater London